Madam White Snake is is a mythological figure in Chinese folk religion. It may also refer to:
 Madam White Snake (TV series), 2001 television series
 Madame White Snake (opera), 2010 opera

See also 
 Legend of the White Snake (disambiguation)